The Bride of the Wind (Die Windsbraut) (or The Tempest) is a 1913–1914 painting by Oskar Kokoschka. The oil on canvas work is housed in the Kunstmuseum Basel. Kokoschka's best known work, it is an allegorical picture featuring a self-portrait by the artist, lying alongside his lover Alma Mahler. 

In 1912, Kokoschka first met Alma Mahler, the recently widowed wife of composer Gustav Mahler. A passionate romance ensued, with the artist producing numerous drawings and paintings of his muse. The painting depicts Mahler in a peaceful sleep beside Kokoschka, who is awake and stares into space. The couple's break-up in 1914 had a profound effect on Kokoschka, whose expressive brushwork grew more turbulent. 

When Kokoschka painted the picture, poet Georg Trakl visited him almost daily and extolled the painting in his poem Die Nacht (The Night).

References
 Johnson, Ken. Modernity Met With Hope and Despair, The New York Times, July 30, 2009
  Grosenick, Uta; Wolf, Norbert. Expressionism, p. 62. Taschen, 2004.  
 Alma in the work of Oskar Kokoschka 

1914 paintings
Paintings by Oskar Kokoschka
Paintings in the collection of the Kunstmuseum Basel